USAB may refer to:
 United States Army Berlin
 USA Baseball, the governing body of baseball in the United States
 USA Basketball, the governing body of basketball in the United States